53 Piscium, abbreviated as 53 Psc, is a star in the zodiac constellation of Pisces. With an apparent magnitude of about 5.9, it is just barely visible to the naked eye. parallax measurements made by the Hipparcos spacecraft place the star at a distance of about 930 light-years (284 parsecs) away.

The spectral type of 53 Piscium is B2.5IV, meaning it is a B-type subgiant. It is 5.4 times more massive than the Sun, and has a luminosity of almost . Its surface temperature is over 17,000 K, typical of a B-type star.

53 Piscium is a Beta Cephei variable, varying by 0.01 magnitudes just under every two hours. For that reason it has been given the AG Piscium. It has also been found to have some variability in common with slowly pulsating B stars.

References

Pisces (constellation)
Piscium, 053
B-type giants
Beta Cephei variables
002903
Piscium, 53
0155
003379
Durchmusterung objects